The yellowband wrasse, Cirrhilabrus luteovittatus, is a species of wrasse native to coral reefs around the Pacific islands of the Caroline Islands, the Marshall Islands, and Pohnpei.

References

Yellowband wrasse
Taxa named by John Ernest Randall 
Fish described in 1988